The Women's time trial B road cycling event at the 2012 Summer Paralympics took place on September 5 at Brands Hatch. Thirteen riders from ten different nations competed. The race distance was 24 km.

Results

References

Women's road time trial B
2012 in women's road cycling